Hexperos is an Italian music group founded by Alessandra Santovito and Francesco Forgione. Their music features instruments such as the medieval flute, hammer dulcimer and Appalachian dulcimer. Hexperos released their work on several platforms, with their most popular song "Winter Rhymes" earning over a million streams on Spotify.

In the group, Santovito performs soprano voice, transverse flute, medieval flute, whistling, hammer dulcimer, Greek lyre, medieval harp, keyboard and percussion for the music. Forgione plays double bass, cello, bardic harp, viol da gamba, percussions, bouzouki, hammer dulcimer, and the keyboard.

Career 
In 2004, their debut song "The Warm Whispers of the Wind" was released on the compilation Flowers Made of Snow by the Swedish label C.M.I (the same label of Alessandra's previous project, Gothica).

In 2007, Hexperos's first full album The Garden of the Hesperides was released under the independent Portuguese label Equilibrium Music. 

Their second album, The Veil of the Queen Mab, was published in September 2010. This album is notably richer in orchestration than their more minimalist debut album. The title of the album came from Nicaraguan writer and poet Rubén Darío's poem El velo de la reina Mab.

Lost in the Great Sea, their third album, has Celtic influences and was also influenced by the band's fascination for ancient history.

Discography 
Studio albums
 The Garden of the Hesperides (2007)
 The Veil of Queen Mab (2010)
 Lost in the Great Sea (2014)
 I Will Carry On (2021)
EPs

 Autumnus (2014)

Compilations 

C.M.I – Flowers made of Snow (2004)
Palace of Worms – Nikolaevka (2008)
Darkroom Production – In the dark room vol. 1 (2008)
Lichtbringer – Cantus 1: Mediaeval Pagan Folk (2010)
Prikosnovénie – Berceuses des Fées et petites Sorcières (2011)
 Sony Music – Progressivamente Story 1970 - 2014 2CD (2014)

Collaborations

Respiri – Corde Oblique (2005) 
 Ősforrás – The Moon and the Night Spirit (2009)
 The Stones of Naples – Corde Oblique (2009)
 Graines de Berceuses (2012)

References

External links
 

Italian musical groups